The Chaoyin Bridge is a historic stone arch bridge over the  in Chaoyang Subdistrict, Wuxing District of Huzhou, Zhejiang, China.

Etymology
Chaoyin Bridge is named after "Chaoyin Ferry".

History
Chaoyin Bridge was originally built in 1539, during Jiajing Emperor's reign of the Ming dynasty (1644–1911). The present version was completed in 1605, during the ruling of Wanli Emperor.

On 7 October 2019, it was listed among the eighth batch of "Major National Historical and Cultural Sites in Zhejiang" by the State Council of China.

Gallery

References

Bridges in Zhejiang
Arch bridges in China
Bridges completed in 1605
Ming dynasty architecture
Buildings and structures completed in 1605
1605 establishments in China
Major National Historical and Cultural Sites in Zhejiang